The 1967 Northwestern Wildcats team represented Northwestern University during the 1967 Big Ten Conference football season. In their fourth year under head coach Alex Agase, the Wildcats compiled a 3–7 record (2–5 against Big Ten Conference opponents) and finished in eighth place in the Big Ten Conference.

The team's offensive leaders were quarterback Bill Melzer with 1,146 passing yards, Bob Olso with 507 rushing yards, and Don Anderson with 376 receiving yards.

Schedule

References

Northwestern
Northwestern Wildcats football seasons
Northwestern Wildcats football